George (Giorgi; c. 1529 – 6 April 1561) was a Georgian prince (batonishvili) of the royal house of Kakheti, a son of King Levan of Kakheti by his second wife, a daughter of Kamal Kara-Musel, Shamkhal of Tarki. He was killed in 1561 in a battle with the Safavid Iranian army, fighting on the side of his brother-in-law, King Simon I of Kartli.

Biography 
George was born of Levan of Kakheti's second marriage to a daughter of Kamal Kara-Musel, the shamkhal of Tarku in Dagestan. He was the eldest of the fourteen children born of this union. According to the 18th-century Georgian historian Prince Vakhushti, Georgewas intended by his father as heir to the throne (Levan had disowned his children by his first marriage to Tinatin Gurieli). In 1561, Simon I of Kartli, ruler of a neighboring Georgian polity, offered Levan—his father-in-law—an alliance against the Safavid Iranian hegemony. Levan, anxious to preserve peace at home, was reluctant, but his son George volunteered with the Kakhetian army for Simon's cause. Arriving at Dzegvi to join the Kartlians, George's troops were attacked and annihilated, on the Easter Day on 6 April 1561, by the Safavid army under Shahverdi Sultan, a Qajar beylerbey of Karabakh, at the battle of Tsikhedidi. George himself was killed in action.

Family 
Prince George was married to an anonymous daughter of King Luarsab I of Kartli. He had three sons, George, Vakhtang, and Khosro. Not much is known about them. Khosro was married to the certain Mariam.

Ancestry

References 

1520s births
1561 deaths
Bagrationi dynasty of the Kingdom of Kakheti
Georgian princes
People from Kakheti
Military personnel killed in action
16th-century people from Georgia (country)
Heirs apparent who never acceded